The Heartbeat Tour was the debut concert tour by singer-songwriter Jessie J in support of her debut studio album Who You Are (2011). The tour visited Europe, South America, Oceania and Asia.

Background
The tour was announced on June 1, 2011, on London radio station Capital FM. General sale tickets for the Heartbeat Tour were released on June 3, 2011. She originally announced 11 UK dates, however, due to high demand, Jessie J added an extra London and Birmingham date to the tour. She announced the extra dates on Twitter, saying, "I just added a second London Hammersmith Apollo and Birmingham Academy date due to demand.#boyyyya".

The international part of the tour was announced in September 2011 and was due to begin late February in Auckland, New Zealand. However, the show was cancelled a few days prior and therefore began in Brisbane, Australia on Thursday, March 1, 2011. During a TV talk show appearance in support of the Australian dates, she agreed to be sawed in half by local magician Sam Powers in his "Thin Model" sawing illusion. After Australia, the tour visited Malaysia, Indonesia and Singapore and returned to the UK for several major UK Festivals including the Isle of Wight Festival and the Wireless Festival. She also made an appearance at the 2012 Teenage Cancer Trust concert.

Reception

Neil McCormick from The Telegraph gave the tour a 3/5 star review saying, "The only thing louder than her tonight is her audience, packed with mothers and daughters who seem to find something empowering in Jessie J's aggressively stomping approach to feminism, kicking cymbals with her black bovver boots and grabbing her crotch to deliver Do It Like a Dude, replete with uncensored Oedipal insults and bold declarations of equal-opportunity sexism. Her other principal message to her admirers is that hoariest of pop empowerment clichés 'be yourself', which she expounds upon at some length in formulaic power ballad Who You Are. Her rather pedestrian band crash in behind her as she works herself into a spiritual frenzy ('Seeing is deceiving, dreaming is believing!')."

Ian Gittens from The Independent also gave the tour 3/5 stars saying, "Jessie J comes into her own live. Strapped into a skimpy purple bondage costume like a Primark Cleopatra, she turns in an exuberant, personality-plus performance that succeeds in temporarily distracting you from the awfulness of her material." Loretta D'Urso from The Music Network said, "The set's simplicity and Jessie J's upheld vigor were admired features of the show. Not fancy in the slightest, the singer encompasses the knowledge that her powerful and kinky voice is enough to snare an audience and keep them pinned for as long as she wants."

Opening acts

 Devlin (United Kingdom: Leg 1)
 Cherri V (select dates)
 Amy Meredith (Australia)
 Ruby Rose (Australia)
 Professor Green (Australia)
 Blush (Malaysia, Indonesia, Singapore)

Setlist

Source:

Band

 Jessie J – (vocals)
 Lewie Allen – (guitar)
 Ginger Hamilton – (drums)
 Hannah Vasanth – (keyboard)
 Phil Simmonds – (bass)
 Phebe Edwards – (backing vocals)
 Cherrice Voncelle – (backing vocals)
 Olivia Leisk – (backing vocals)

Tour dates

 Festivals and other miscellaneous performances

 This concert was part of the "F1 Rocks São Paulo"
 This concert was part of the "Jingle Bell Ball"
 These concerts were part of the "Future Music Festival"
 This concert was part of the "Teenage Cancer Trust"
 This concert was part of the "Summertime Ball"
 This concert was part of the "Isle of Wight Festival"
 This concert was part of the "Radio 1's Big Weekend"
 This concert was part of the "Belgrade Calling Festival"
 This concert was part of "Live at the Marquee"
 This concert was part of "T in the Park"
 This concert was part of "Wireless Festival"
 This concert was part of "Warwick Castle Ultimate Pop"

 This concert was part of "Mallorca Live"
 This concert was part of "Ibiza Live"
 This concert was part of the "Orange Summer Party"
 This concert was part of "Festival Sudoeste"
 This concert was part of the "Sandown Park Music Nights"
 This concert was part of "Party in the Paddock"
 This concert was part of the "Alnwick Castle Summer Concert Series"
 This concert was part of the "Gibraltar Music Festival"
 This concert was part of the "BBC Radio 2: Live in Hyde Park"
 This concert was part of the "Mastercard Priceless Gig"
 This concert was part of the "iTunes Festival"

 Cancellations and rescheduled shows

References

Jessie J
2011 concert tours
2012 concert tours